Tara Palmeri (born September 1, 1987) is an American journalist. She is currently the Senior Political Correspondent for subscription news platform Puck.  Previously, she served as Chief National Correspondent at Politico and  host and chief investigative reporter of two Sony Music podcasts: "Broken: Seeking Justice" and "Power: The Maxwells".  She previously worked for Washington Examiner and the New York Post and was a White House correspondent for ABC News.

Personal life
Palmeri was born on September 1, 1987 in New York. She attended American University and graduated with a bachelor's degree in Public Communication in 2008.

Career
Palmeri started her career at CNN as a news assistant in the D.C. bureau in 2009. She subsequently joined the Washington Examiner where she co-wrote a daily column called "Yeas & Nays".

She moved to New York in 2010 when she was hired by the New York Post to write for the paper's Page Six gossip column. She also worked as a general assignment reporter and covered stories including the John Edwards trial, the Newtown, Connecticut school shooting, the 2012 Democratic and Republican National conventions and the Jovan Belcher murder-suicide. Palmeri then began covering politics as a New York City Hall reporter.

She was hired by Politico to cover European politics from Brussels in 2015. After the 2016 presidential election, Politico had her come back to Washington as a White House reporter covering the Trump administration. During her tenure, she broke exclusive stories, including one on White House staffers who failed FBI background checks, which led White House Press Secretary Sean Spicer to call Palmeri "an idiot with no real sources."

CNN announced in 2017 that Palmeri was hired as a political analyst for the network, while continuing to cover President Trump for Politico. Palmeri was hired by ABC News as a full-time White House correspondent in Oct. 2017. From ABC News president James Goldston’s memo on her hire: "Tara is a tenacious reporter with a keen instinct for political scoops, and a thoughtful analyst of both politics and policy... Tara joins us at a time when news from Washington continues to dominate the news cycle and impact every aspect of our audience’s lives."

Palmeri left ABC News and re-joined Politico to work as a co-author of its newsletter Playbook in 2021. Her reporting led to a White House official resigning early in the Biden administration. According to Vanity Fair, White House Deputy Press Secretary TJ Ducklo had threatened Palmeri, telling her he would "destroy her" if she published a story about his relationship with Alexi McCammond, an NBC, MSNBC and Axios reporter. Ducklo also reportedly made "derogatory and misogynistic comments" towards Palmeri during a phone call and accused her of being "jealous" of his relationship with McCammond. On February 12, Ducklo was suspended without pay by the White House for one week. The following day, Ducklo resigned from his White House position over the matter.  In 2022, Palmeri joined journalism startup Puck. At Puck, Palmeri broke the news that Nancy Pelosi would resign as Speaker of the House after the 2022 midterm elections.

References

1987 births
Living people
American women journalists
American University School of Communication alumni
American people of Polish descent
21st-century American journalists
Journalists from New York (state)
21st-century American women